Fayette Township is one of twelve townships in Vigo County, Indiana, United States. As of the 2010 census, its population was 2,630 and it contained 1,099 housing units.

Geography

Adjacent townships
 Clinton Township, Vermillion County (north)
 Florida Township, Parke County (northeast)
 Otter Creek Township (east)
 Harrison Township (southeast)
 Sugar Creek Township (south)
 Elbridge Township, Edgar County, Illinois (west)
 Stratton Township, Edgar County, Illinois (west)

Unincorporated communities
 Shepardsville
 Libertyville
 New Goshen
 Pine Ridge
 Sandford
 Shirkieville
 Tecumseh
 West New Goshen

Cemeteries
The township contains these two cemeteries: Barbour and Pleasantview.

Rivers
 Wabash River

School districts
 Vigo County School Corporation

Political districts
 Indiana's 8th congressional district
 State House District 42
 State Senate District 38

References
Sources
 United States Census Bureau 2007 TIGER/Line Shapefiles
 United States Board on Geographic Names (GNIS)
 IndianaMap
Notes

External links

Townships in Vigo County, Indiana
Terre Haute metropolitan area
Townships in Indiana